Bangalore University, established in 1886, provides affiliation to over 500 colleges, with a total student enrolment exceeding 300,000. The university has two campuses within Bangalore – Jnanabharathi and Central College. University Visvesvaraya College of Engineering was established in the year 1917, by Bharat Ratna Sir M. Visvesvaraya, At present, the UVCE is the only engineering college under the Bangalore University. Bangalore also has many private Engineering Colleges affiliated to Visvesvaraya Technological University.

Some of the institutes in Bangalore which are the premier institutes for scientific research and study in India are:
 Indian Institute of Science, which was established in 1909 in Bangalore
 National Institute of Mental Health and Neuro Sciences (NIMHANS).
 National Centre for Biological Sciences (NCBS), 
 Jawaharlal Nehru Centre for Advanced Scientific Research (JNCASR), 
 Indian Institute of Astrophysics, 
 Raman Research Institute, and 
 International Centre for Theoretical Sciences

Nationally renowned professional institutes located in Bangalore include 
 National Law School of India University (NLSIU),
 University of Agricultural Sciences, Bangalore (UASB), 
 National Institute of Design(NID), 
 National Institute of Fashion Technology (NIFT),  
 Indian Institute of Management, Bangalore (IIM-B), 
 Institute of Wood Science and Technology, 
 Indian Statistical Institute and 
 International Institute of Information Technology, Bangalore (IIIT-B)

Private universities in Bangalore include institutes like Alliance University, Jain University, Christ University, Azim Premji University and PES University.
Bangalore medical colleges include St. John's Medical College (SJMC) and Bangalore Medical College and Research Institute (BMCRI). The M. P. Birla Institute of Fundamental Research has a branch located in Bangalore.

Bengaluru has a range of educational institutions from schools to Aerospace Engineering, Agriculture, Animation&Design, Biotechnology, Business Management, to Nanotechnology institutes.

Universities
 Alliance University
 Azim Premji University
 Bangalore University
 Christ University
 CMR University
 Dayananda Sagar University
 Garden City University
 Jain University
 M S Ramaiah University of Applied Sciences
 Manipal University
 PES University
 Presidency University
 Reva University
 SVKM's NMIMS
 Symbiosis International University
 St. Joseph's University
 University of Agricultural Sciences
 Visvesvaraya Technological University

Design
 ICAT Design & Media College, (Bachelor’s Degree, Master’s Degree & Post-Graduate Programs)
 Indian Institute of Science, IISc (M. Des, M.Sc, PhD)
 National Institute of Design (NID), R&D Campus (M.Des, DDE, DRE, IID)
 National Institute of Fashion Technology (B.Des, B.F.Tech)
 Srishti School of Art, Design and Technology (Foundation Studies, Prof Diploma, Advanced Diploma)
 Strate School of Design ( M.Sc, B.Sc in Design)

Management
 Alliance University - Alliance School of Business
 AIMS Institutes
 Center for Management Studies (BBA)
 Indian Institute of Management
 Christ University Bangalore School of Business and Management
 ISBR Business School (MBA, PGDM, PhD)
 Jyoti Nivas College
 MATS Institute of Management & Entrepreneurship (PGDM)
 Mount Carmel College
 M.S.Ramaiah Institute of Management (MBA, PGDM)
 Sri Bhagawan Mahaveer Jain College (BBA, MBA + PGPM, PG Diploma (Enterprise Management + PGDM), PGDBM)
 St. Hopkins College 
 St Joseph's Institute of Management
 SVKM'S NMIMS (PGDM, BBA, B.Sc. Finance, B.Sc. Economics)
 Swiss Graduate School of Management (MBA)
 Symbiosis International University 
 WE School (PGDM)
 Xavier Institute of Management and Entrepreneurship
 Jagdish Sheth School of Management

Commerce
 Mount Carmel College
 St. Joseph's College of Commerce
 Jyoti Nivas College
 Christ University School of Commerce, Finance & Accountancy

Engineering

 A.P.S. College of Engineering
 Acharya Institute of Technology
 Adarsha Institute of Technology
 Alliance University - Alliance College of Engineering and Design
 Alpha College of Engineering
 AMC Engineering College
 B.M.S. College of Engineering
 B.M.S. Institute of Technology and Management
 Bangalore Institute of Technology
 BNM Institute of Technology
 Brindavan College of Engineering
 BTL Institute of Technology
 City Engineering College
 CMR Institute of Technology
 CMR University
 Dayananda Sagar College of Engineering
 Dayananda Sagar University
 Don Bosco Institute of Technology
 Dr. Ambedkar Institute of Technology
 Global Academy of Technology
 HKBK College of Engineering
 JSS Academy of Technical Education
 Jyothy Institute of Technology
 Kammavari Sangha Institute of Technology
 M. S. Ramaiah University of Applied Sciences
 MVJ College of Engineering
 Nagarjuna College of Engineering and Technology
 New Horizon College of Engineering
 Nitte Meenakshi Institute of Technology
 Oxford College of Engineering
 PES University
 Presidency College
 R.V. College of Engineering
 Ramaiah Institute of Technology
 Reva Institute of Technology and Management
 RNS Institute of Technology
 Sai Vidya Institute of Technology
 Sambhram Institute of Technology
 Sapthagiri College of Engineering
 Shri Pillappa College of Engineering
 Sir M. Visvesvaraya Institute of Technology
 SJB Institute of Technology
 Sri Revana Siddeshwara Institute of Technology
 Sri Sairam College of Engineering
 Sri Venkateshwara College of Engineering
 T John Institute of Technology
 University Visvesvaraya College of Engineering
 Vemana Institute of Technology
 Vivekananda Institute of Technology

Information Technology & Computer Science
 Indian Institute of Science (IISc)

Law
 Alliance University - Alliance School of Law
 Christ University - School of Law
 KLE Society's Law College
 National Law School of India University 
 Presidency University
 University Law College, Bangalore University, Bangalore University

Medical
 Bangalore Medical College and Research Institute
 Kempegowda Institute of Medical Sciences (KIMS)
 Rajarajeswari Medical College and Hospital
 St. John's Medical College
 National Institute of Mental Health and Neuro Sciences
 Vydehi Institute of Medical Sciences and Research Centre
 Sri Jayadeva Institute of Cardiovascular Sciences and Research

Neuro-Sciences
 National Institute of Mental Health and Neuro Sciences

Sciences
 Indian Institute of Astrophysics
 Indian Institute of Horticultural Research
 Indian Institute of Science
 Indian Statistical Institute
 Institute of Bioinformatics and Applied Biotechnology (IBAB)
 Institute of Wood Science and Technology
 Jawaharlal Nehru Centre for Advanced Scientific Research
 Jyoti Nivas College
 Mount Carmel College
 National Tuberculosis Institute
 Oxford College of Science
 St. Joseph's College
 Indian Academy Degree College - Autonomous

Others
 APS Polytechnic
 College of Fine Arts, Bangalore
 Jyoti Nivas College
 National College
 Sri Bhagawan Mahaveer Jain College

References

Bangalore
 
Educational institutions